Lucilia may refer to:

 Lucilia (wife of Lucretius), the wife of Roman philosopher Lucretius
 Lucilia (fly), a greenbottle fly genus in the family Calliphoridae
 Lucilia (plant), a plant genus in the family Asteraceae

and also:
 Napaea lucilia, a butterfly species in the genus Napaea (Mesosemiini, Riodinidae)
 Sabatinca lucilia, a moth species

See also
 Lucilius

Genus disambiguation pages